The Knockout Stage of the 1994 Federation Cup Europe/Africa Zone was the final stage of the Zonal Competition involving teams from Europe and Africa. Those that qualified for this stage placed first and second in their respective pools.

The sixteen teams were then randomly drawn into a two-stage knockout tournament, with the four winners qualifying for the World Group.

Draw

Semifinals

Belgium vs. Turkey

Great Britain vs. Israel

Austria vs. Russia

Slovenia vs. Ukraine

Georgia vs. Zimbabwe

Slovakia vs. Greece

Romania vs. Hungary

Belarus vs. Portugal

Finals

Belgium vs. Great Britain

Austria vs. Ukraine

Georgia vs. Slovakia

Romania vs. Belarus

See also
Fed Cup structure

References

External links
 Fed Cup website

1994 Federation Cup Europe/Africa Zone